Gats may refer to:
 Gats (surname)
 Els Quatre Gats ("The Four Cats"), a cafe in Barcelona, Spain which opened on 12 June 1897
 Saint-Cyr-des-Gâts, a village and commune of the Vendée département in France
 "Gats", a song by Susumu Hirasawa from Sword-Wind Chronicle BERSERK Original Soundtrack

GATS may refer to :
 General Agreement on Trade in Services, a treaty of the World Trade Organization
 Tessalit Airport (ICAO identifier: GATS) in Tessalit, Mali

See also
 Gat (disambiguation)